Warso Moe Oo (born 27 July 1994) is a Burmese actress, commercial model and singer. She has achieved fame and success as an actress and singer. Throughout her career, she has acted in over 200 films and released a solo album Mite Lar Pyaw Kyi.

Early life and education
Waeso Moe Oo was born on 27 July 1994 in Yangon, Myanmar to parent Myo Myint Naing and his wife Theingi Aung. She is the eldest daughter of two siblings, having a younger sister. She attended high school at Basic Education High School No. 2 Latha. She has been temporarily suspended in high school for working as an actress.

Acting career

Before 2008: Beginning  as a child actor
She began her acting career as a child actor at the age of 8. She first appearance in the film Thanlwin Yay Bal Mhar Khan (Thanlwin water where dried) in 2002. She has appeared in many Burmese films as a child actor.

2008–2009: Recognition and major roles

In 2008, Warso participated as an Academy tray hold, who will carry the golden trophies presented to Myanmar Academy Award winners, at the 2008 Myanmar Academy Awards Ceremony which gained the first recognition from her fans. Then came the offers for TV commercials. Her hardwork as a model and acting in commercials was noticed by the film industry and soon, movie casting offers came rolling in. Rising to fame in 2009, she became an actress and signed for the contract with production in Myanmar as their lead actress for over 50 films. She gain increased attention and popularity with the film Oasis.

2012–present: Breaking into the big screen 
In 2012, she took starred in her first big-screen film Ogyi 30 Olay 500 (Big pot 30 small pot 500) where she played the leading role with Kyaw Kyaw Bo. In 2014, she starred the female lead in the historical documentary film The Great Myanmar, played the role of Manisanda with Naing Naing who portrayed as Kyansittha, which premiered in Myanmar cinemas on 15 September 2018 at the Democracy Film Festival. The film was considered as Myanmar's first 3D film and based on the History of Pagan, presented by Forever Group and South Korean EBS. From 2009 to present, she has acted in over 200 video/films. Sometime, she is an anyeint dancer with the Burmese traditional dance troupe Htawara Hninzi.

Music career

Warso's first foray into the music industry as she would later go on to sing "A Chit Ko A Yone A Kyi Ma Shi" song at the event of Shwe FM's anniversary. She performed in Pyazat at the opening ceremony of the 2013 Southeast Asian Games, held in Nay Pyi Taw, Myanmar on 22 December 2013. Since performed in the Sea Game, she engaged in the stage performances, and many concerts at various locations throughout Myanmar.

Warso participated in the collaborative albums "Shwe FM 4th Anniversary" album in 2013, "Shwe FM 5th Anniversary" album in 2014, and "Shwe FM 6th Anniversary" album in 2015. Since 2014, Warso started entertaining in Thingyan music concerts every year.

In 2015, Warso started endeavoring to be able to produce and distribute her first solo album. She launched her debut solo album "Mite Lar Pyaw Kyi" on 2 March 2017 which spawned more huge hits.

Political activities
Following the 2021 Myanmar coup d'état, Warso was active in the anti-coup movement both in person at rallies and through social media. Denouncing the military coup, she has taken part in protests since February. She joined the "We Want Justice" three-finger salute movement. The movement was launched on social media, and many celebrities have joined the movement.

On 3 April 2021, warrants for her arrest were issued under section 505 (a) of the penal code by the State Administration Council for speaking out against the military coup. Along with several other celebrities, she was charged with calling for participation in the Civil Disobedience Movement (CDM) and damaging the state's ability to govern, with supporting the Committee Representing Pyidaungsu Hluttaw, and with generally inciting the people to disturb the peace and stability of the nation.

Personal life
Warso is in a relationship with hip hop singer Phyo Lay since 2017. The couple is singing and working together.

Filmography

Film (Cinema)

Over 30 films, including 
 Ogyi 30 Olay 500 (အိုးကြီး၃ဝ အိုးလေး၅ဝဝ) (2012)
 The Great Myanmar (ကြီးမြတ်သောမြန်မာ) (2018)

Film

Over 170 films

Discography

Solo albums
Mite Lar Pyaw Kyi (2017)

Collaborative albums
Shwe FM 4th Anniversary (2013)
Shwe FM 5th Anniversary (2014)
Shwe FM 6th Anniversary (2015)

References

External links

1994 births
Living people
Burmese film actresses
Burmese female models
21st-century Burmese actresses
21st-century Burmese women singers
People from Yangon